Mary Pauline Stewart (born December 8, 1945), also known by her married name Mary Stewart McIlwaine, is a Canadian former competitive swimmer.

Swimming career
Stewart twice broke the world record in the women's 100-metre butterfly in the early 1960s.  Stewart also competed in freestyle events as a member of the Canadian national team in major international championships.

As a 14-year-old, she represented Canada in the 1960 Summer Olympics in Rome, where she finished eighth in the women's 100-metre freestyle, and also competed in the preliminary hears of the women's 4x100-metre medley relay event.  Two years later at the 1962 Commonwealth Games in Perth, Western Australia, she won the gold medal in the women's 100-metre butterfly.  At the 1963 Pan American Games in São Paulo, Brazil, Stewart enjoyed a four-medal performance, garnering silver medals for her second-place performances in the 100-metre freestyle, 100-metre butterfly, 4x100-metre freestyle relay, and the 4x100-metre medley relay.

Despite being of Canadian nationality, she won the ASA National British Championships over 110 yards butterfly 1963.

In her final international appearance at the 1964 Summer Olympics in Tokyo, she finished eighth in the 100-metre butterfly, and also competed as a member of the Canadian teams in the 4x100-metre freestyle and 4x100-metre medley relay events.

Personal life
She is the sister of Helen Stewart.

See also
 World record progression 100 metres butterfly

References

External links 
 
 
 

1945 births
Living people
Canadian female freestyle swimmers
Commonwealth Games gold medallists for Canada
World record setters in swimming
Olympic swimmers of Canada
Swimmers from Vancouver
Swimmers at the 1959 Pan American Games
Swimmers at the 1960 Summer Olympics
Swimmers at the 1962 British Empire and Commonwealth Games
Swimmers at the 1963 Pan American Games
Swimmers at the 1964 Summer Olympics
Pan American Games silver medalists for Canada
Commonwealth Games bronze medallists for Canada
Commonwealth Games medallists in swimming
Pan American Games medalists in swimming
Medalists at the 1963 Pan American Games
Medallists at the 1962 British Empire and Commonwealth Games